Verge, Le Verge, Vergé or The Verge may refer to:

People
 David Vergé
 Jack Verge (died 1915), Australian rugby union player
 John Verge (1782–1861), English architect, builder and pioneer settler of New South Wales, Australia
 Lynn Verge (born c. 1951), Canadian lawyer and politician
 Marianne Le Verge (born 1979), French former swimmer who competed in the 1996 Summer Olympics
 Roger Vergé (1930–2015), French chef and restaurateur
 Wade Verge, 21st century Canadian politician
 William E. Verge (1901–1973), United States Navy rear admiral

Music
 Verge (album), musical compilation album by I've Sound
 The Verge (album), a 2011 album by the band There for Tomorrow
 "Verge" (song), a 2015 song by Owl City
 Verge music festival

Media
 The Verge (XM), a Canadian satellite radio station
 The Verge, a technology news network
 The Verge, a live videogame news and review TV programme on Vuzu in South Africa

Other uses
 Verge (cryptocurrency), a secure and anonymous cryptocurrency
 Verge, the jurisdiction of the Marshalsea Court
 Verge or virge, a ceremonial rod
 Road verge, a strip of grass or other vegetation beside a road
 The Verge, Singapore, a shopping mall in Singapore
 Verge Rocks, Graham Land, Antarctica
 Verge escapement, a clock escapement mechanism
 Verge3D, a 3D web authoring software
 Verge (royal court) an area of special legal jurisdiction around the English royal court

See also 
On the Verge (disambiguation)
Verges (disambiguation)